Vulpavus ("ancestor of foxes") is an extinct paraphyletic genus of placental mammals from clade Carnivoraformes, that lived in North America from early to middle Eocene.

Phylogeny
The phylogenetic relationships of genus Vulpavus are shown in the following cladogram:

See also
 Mammal classification
 Carnivoraformes
 Miacidae

References

†
Extinct mammals of North America
Miacids
Prehistoric placental genera